John Gerald Hawks was an American screenwriter. He wrote several scripts for Thomas H. Ince's Kay-Bee Pictures. His career ended with the transition to talking pictures requiring scripted dialogue.

One of his scripts was made in tribute to newly deceased jurist Juan J. Carrillo. He wrote the first photoplay featuring Mabel Normand.

Filmography

The Quakeress (1913)
The Geisha (1914)
Aloha Oe (1915) co-written with Ince
"Bad Buck" of Santa Ynez (1915)
D'artagnan (1915)
House of His Fathers (1915) co-written with Ince
Raiders (1915) co-written with Ince
The Three Musketeers (1916)
The Vagabond Prince (1916)
 The Raiders (1916)
The Primal Lure (1916), an adaptation of a Vingie E. Roe novel
Somewhere in France (1916), based on a book
Chicken Casey (1917)
Wooden Shoes (1917)
A Strange Transgressor (1917), from a story
 Paws of the Bear (1917)
The Firefly of Tough Luck (1917)
The Bride of Hate (1917)
 The Dark Road (1917)
 The Last of the Ingrams (1917)
 Paddy O'Hara (1917)
 Blood Will Tell (1917)
Truthful Tulliver  (1917)
 Time Locks and Diamonds (1917)
 The Tar Heel Warrior (1917)
The Millionaire Vagrant (1917)
Flare-Up Sal (1918)
Partners Three (1919)
Under Crimson Skies (1920)
 Love in the Dark (1922)
 The Glorious Fool (1922)
Hearts Aflame (1923) 
The Sea Hawk (1924)  
The Splendid Road (1925)
Her Husband's Secret (1925)
The Price of Pleasure (1925)
Percy (1925)
The Combat (1926)
Breed of the Sea (1926)
Enemies of Society (1927)
The Sonora Kid (1927)
 Ladies Beware (1927)
Shanghaied (1927)
Freedom of the Press (1928)
The Michigan Kid  (1928)
Melody Lane (1929)

References

External links
 

Year of birth missing
20th-century American male writers
American male screenwriters
Year of death missing
20th-century American writers